Khodaabad (also Romanized as Khodāābād; also known as Khowdābād and Khudābād) is a village in Deris Rural District, in the Central District of Kazerun County, Fars Province, Iran. At the 2006 census, its population was 329, in 76 families.

References 

Populated places in Kazerun County